Sergei Alexandrovich Monia (born 15 April 1983) is a Russian professional basketball player. He was selected by the NBA club the Portland Trail Blazers, in the first round (23rd overall) of the 2004 NBA draft.

Professional career
Monia played briefly for the Portland Trail Blazers and the Sacramento Kings, during the 2005–06 NBA season, playing in 26 games and averaging 3 points per game, in 13 minutes per game.

On 23 February 2006 Monia and Seattle SuperSonics' center Vitaly Potapenko, were traded to the Kings, in exchange for power forward Brian Skinner (who ended up with the Trail Blazers), in a three-team deal. Monia saw action in only three games for the Kings, and was waived on 28 July 2006, because of his desire to play professionally in the Russian Superleague A for Dynamo Moscow.

In June 2010, Monia signed a two-year deal with the Russian club Khimki. With them, he won the EuroCup championship in 2012. In June 2012, he extended his contract with Khimki, for two more years. On 6 March 2015 he signed a new three-year contract extension with Khimki.

Russian national basketball team
Monia has also been a member of the senior Russian national basketball team. With the Russian national team, he played at the EuroBasket 2003, the EuroBasket 2005, the 2008 Summer Olympics, the EuroBasket 2009, the 2010 FIBA World Championship, the EuroBasket 2013, and the EuroBasket 2015. He also won a gold medal at the EuroBasket 2007, a bronze medal at the EuroBasket 2011, and a bronze at the 2012 Summer Olympics.

Career statistics

NBA

Regular season

|-
| align="left" | 2005–06
| align="left" | Portland
| 23 || 15 || 14.6 || .341 || .273 || .667 || 2.2 || .8 || .3 || .2 || 3.3
|-
| align="left" | 2005–06
| align="left" | Sacramento
| 3 || 0 || 2.3 || .000 || .000 || 1.000 || .3 || .0 || .3 || .0 || .7
|- class="sortbottom"
| style="text-align:left;"| Career
| style="text-align:left;"|
| 26 || 15 || 13.2 || .333 || .265 || .714 || 2.0 || .7 || .3 || .2 || 3.0

References

External links

 
 Sergei Monia at euroleague.net
 
 Sergei Monia at eurobasket.com
 Sergei Monia at vtb-league.com

1983 births
Living people
2010 FIBA World Championship players
Basketball players at the 2008 Summer Olympics
Basketball players at the 2012 Summer Olympics
BC Avtodor Saratov players
BC Dynamo Moscow players
BC Khimki players
FIBA EuroBasket-winning players
Fort Worth Flyers players
Medalists at the 2012 Summer Olympics
National Basketball Association players from Russia
Olympic basketball players of Russia
Olympic bronze medalists for Russia
Olympic medalists in basketball
PBC CSKA Moscow players
Portland Trail Blazers draft picks
Portland Trail Blazers players
Power forwards (basketball)
Russian men's basketball players
Russian expatriate basketball people in the United States
Sacramento Kings players
Shooting guards
Small forwards
Sportspeople from Saratov